Raymond Lee Sadler (born September 19, 1980 in Clifton, Texas) is an American former professional baseball outfielder. He played in Major League Baseball in 2005 for the Pittsburgh Pirates. His cousin Donnie Sadler, has also played Major League Baseball.

Professional career
Sadler played baseball at Clifton High School, and in 1999 the Chicago Cubs selected him with the 920th pick of the June draft, as part of the 30th round. The Cubs did so with the intention of treating him as a "draft and follow" player, and he signed with the Cubs after 2 seasons at Hill College, a junior college in Hillsboro, Texas.

Sadler was traded from the Cubs to the Pittsburgh Pirates on August 17, 2003, in a deadline deal for Randall Simon. When outfielder Craig Wilson injured a tendon in his hand on May 8, 2005, the Pirates turned to Sadler as an emergency replacement, purchasing his contract from the Altoona Curve. He had no time to prepare, but reported immediately to the Pirates' clubhouse, where he was mistaken for a construction worker by surprised manager Lloyd McClendon. Sadler made his major league debut that night, and three days later, he collected his first major league hit: a home run to left field against Giants starter Noah Lowry.

After playing three games in left field, Sadler was optioned back down to the minors on May 13, and he was designated for assignment on September 16. This was the first outright assignment of Sadler's career, so he remained with the Pirates organization after clearing waivers. After the 2006 season, Sadler was acquired by the Houston Astros organization. He played the entire 2007 season as a member of the Corpus Christi Hooks, Houston's AA affiliate, leading the team in home runs and runs batted in while earning Team MVP honors. In 2008, Sadler split time between Corpus Christi and the Triple-A Round Rock Express in the Astros' system.

Sadler became a free agent at the end of the 2008 season and signed a minor league contract with the Tampa Bay Rays in December. On August 6, 2009 Sadler was released by the Rays, and signed a minor league contract with the Houston Astros two days later. He became a free agent again after the season, and in 2010 signed with the Kansas City T-Bones of the independent Northern League. He played for the club in the 2011 season as well.

Sadler played for the Kansas City T-Bones of the American Association of Independent Professional Baseball in 2012. In 2013, Sadler played for the Winnipeg Goldeyes and T-Bones of the American Association of Independent Professional Baseball. Sadler played for the Goldeyes and T-Bones during the 2014 season as well and played for the Sussex County Miners in 2015.

References

External links

1980 births
African-American baseball players
Altoona Curve players
American expatriate baseball players in Canada
Arizona League Cubs players
Baseball players from Texas
Caffe Danesi Nettuno players
Cardenales de Lara players
American expatriate baseball players in Venezuela
Caribes de Anzoátegui players
Corpus Christi Hooks players
Daytona Cubs players
Durham Bulls players
American expatriate baseball players in Italy
Hill College Rebels baseball players
Indianapolis Indians players
Kansas City T-Bones players
Lansing Lugnuts players
Living people
Major League Baseball left fielders
People from Clifton, Texas
Pittsburgh Pirates players
Round Rock Express players
Sussex County Miners players
Venados de Mazatlán players
American expatriate baseball players in Mexico
West Tennessee Diamond Jaxx players
Winnipeg Goldeyes players
21st-century African-American sportspeople
20th-century African-American people